Croatia women's national softball team is the national team for Croatia. The team competed at the 1994 ISF Women's World Championship in St. John's, Newfoundland where they finished twenty-eighth.

References

External links 
 International Softball Federation

Softball
Women's national softball teams
Softball in Croatia